The National University of Laos (NUOL) is a university in Vientiane, the capital of Laos. Founded in 1996, with departments brought in from other existing colleges, it is the only national university in the country. The NUOL accepts students from all over Laos, along with international students.

The university is a partner of the Greater Mekong Sub-region Academic and Research Network (GMSARN) and ASEAN University Network (AUN).

History
National University of Laos "NUOL" was established by merging the higher education institutes which were under the supervision of several ministries into one university under the Ministry of Education in accordance to the Decree Number 50/PM of the Prime Minister of the Democratic People's Republic of Laos dated 9 June 1995.

NUOL is a multi-campus structure, with five campuses including, Dongdok campus (Central), Sokpaluang campus (Faculty of Engineering), Nabong campus (Faculty of Agriculture), Donnokkhum campus (Faculty of Law) and Tadthong campus (Faculty of Water resource). It composes of 13 faculties, 2 institutes (Institute of Lao-Japan Human Resource Development and Institute of Chinese Confucianism), a Central Library, six centers and a small hospital.

NUOL has played 4 roles in 1/ providing higher education in areas required for the socio-economic development of Laos; 2/ performing research in natural and social sciences; 3/ preserving the arts, culture and traditions of the nation; and 4/ providing academic services to society. It is known for its diversity programs in Bachelor degrees; some Master degree programs are conducted in its academic disciplines, and Doctoral degree programs, as well.

Since the opening of its first academic year on 5 November 1996, the number of students has increased from 8,053 (including 2,170 females) to around 40,000 in 2009-2010 academic year. Then, since the policy of increasing vocational manpower of country, the acceptable number of students come down to around 23,000 student in recent year. At present, NUOL is accepted as one of the main and important public organization in the Laos.

In modernization of the university toward digital-based university in the future, IT Center was established in 2002 and be directly supervised by president of NUOL. The IT Center of NUOL is upgraded its roles to 1/ Develop and Manage the ICT infrastructure in the whole university, 2/ Develop ICT human resource toward "ICT based society", 3/ Supporting and Doing research in the field of Computer Science and ICT, and 4/ to provide academic services. For strengthen the ICT system in line with the University ICT Development Plan, initialize in the academic year 2004-2005, ICT infrastructure had been supported by Sida-SAREC in 2005-2010. The ICT Development plan of university is adjusted or improved almost every year in order to catch up with the change of the technology. However, it is hard in order to take it into action due to the lack of budget for it investment. Many of ICT works are made possible through outside support.

Academics

Faculties

National University of Laos (NUOL) consists of 13 faculties:
 Faculty of Forestry
 Faculty of Education
 Faculty of Social Sciences
 Faculty of Natural Sciences (FNS)
 Faculty of Letters
 Faculty of Economics and Business Administration
 Faculty of Agriculture
 Faculty of Laws and Political Sciences
 Faculty of Engineering
 Faculty of Architecture
 Faculty of Environmental Sciences
 Faculty of Sport Science and Physical Education
 Faculty of Water Resources

Membership of organizations
 ASEAN University Network (AUN)
 ASEAN University Network/Southeast Asia Engineering Education Development Network (AUN/SEED-NET)
 Agence universitaire de la Francophonie (AUF)
 Greater Mekong Sub-region Academic and Research Network (GMSARN)

Foreign cooperation and consortia
  International University
  National Dong Hwa University
  Chulalongkorn University
  Chiang Mai University
  Khon Kaen University
  Kasetsart University
  Thammasat University
  King Mongkut's Institute of Technology Ladkrabang
  Udon Thani Rajabhat University

See also

Communications in Laos
Foreign relations of Laos
List of Laos-related topics
Transport in Laos

References

External links

National University of Laos
Laos cultural profile (Ministry of Information and Culture/Visiting Arts)
Ministry of Foreign Affairs of Lao PDR

Educational institutions established in 1996
Universities in Laos
National universities
ASEAN University Network
National University of Laos
Forestry education
1996 establishments in Laos